Prampir Makara (UNGEGN: ,; meaning 'Seventh of January') is a district (khan) in Phnom Penh, Cambodia. The district is subdivided into 8 sangkats and 33 kroms. It has a population of 71,092. It is the smallest district by land area but is the most densely populated district in Phnom Penh.

Administration

Education
Canadian International School of Phnom Penh maintains the Olympia City Preschool is in Prampir Makara Section.

References

Districts of Phnom Penh